Agoura is an unincorporated community of Los Angeles County, which is located southeast of the city of Agoura Hills, California, adjacent to the city of Calabasas in Los Angeles County. Agoura was the historical name of the area, before much of the area was developed and before the incorporation of the city of Agoura Hills. There are a few nearby pockets of unincorporated areas that contain a handful of houses. Much of the area is also often referred to as the neighborhood of Old Agoura. The ZIP code is 91301 and the area codes are 747 and 818.

History
A stagecoach stop here was known as "Vegar Junction" and in the 1920s the community was briefly known as Picture City, as Paramount Pictures owned the Paramount Ranch,  a movie ranch  filming outdoor scenes and Western movies.

To obtain a post office of its own, the Postal Service required the residents to choose a one-word name, and in 1927 they chose the last name of Pierre Agoure. Pierre was a local French Basque immigrant who had settled in the area in 1871 to live the lifestyle of a Californio rancher, and styled himself Don Pierre Agoure.  His name was chosen for the post office as it was the shortest name proposed, but it is unknown whether the changed final letter was an error or an attempt to make it easier to spell or pronounce.

The city of Agoura Hills incorporated in 1982 with the remaining unincorporated areas identified as Agoura.

Notable people

Erik Affholter (born 1966), American football NFL wide receiver 
Brad Delson, lead guitarist of Linkin Park
Kario Salem, actor

See also
Rancho Las Virgenes — 19th-century Mexican land grant in the area

References

Neighborhoods in Agoura Hills, California
Unincorporated communities in Los Angeles County, California
Conejo Valley
Populated places in the Santa Monica Mountains
Populated places established in 1871
1871 establishments in California
Unincorporated communities in California